Hypophytala ultramarina, the ultramarine flash, is a butterfly in the family Lycaenidae. It is found in Togo, Nigeria (south and the Cross River loop), Cameroon and the western part of the Republic of the Congo. The habitat consists of forests.

References

Butterflies described in 1999
Poritiinae